Kolaka Regency (Kabupaten Kolaka) is a regency of Southeast Sulawesi Province, Indonesia. It covers an area of 2,958.69 km2 and had a population of 208,817 at the 2010 Census, rising to 237,587 at the 2020 Census. The principal town lies at Kolaka.

Administrative districts 
The Kolaka Regency was until 2013 divided into twenty districts (kecamatan). On 14 December 2012, the Indonesian Parliament approved the establishment of a new East Kolaka Regency (Kabupaten Kolaka Timur), and in 2013, under Law No. 8 of 2013, the nine eastern kecamatan were removed to form the new East Kolaka Regency, leaving the eleven western kecamatan in Kolaka Regency. A twelfth district (Iwoimendaa) has subsequently been added by splitting off the western villages of Wolo District. The twelve districts are tabulated below with their areas and their populations at the 2010 Census and the 2020 Census. The table also includes the location of the district headquarters.

Note: (a) the 2010 population of the new Iwoimendaa District is included in the 2010 figure for Wolo District, from which it was later cut out.

Climate
Kolaka Regency has a tropical rainforest climate (Af) with moderate rainfall from August to October and heavy rainfall from November to July. The following climate data is for the town of Kolaka, the seat of regency.

References

Regencies of Southeast Sulawesi